Hevea camargoana is a species of flowering plant in the genus Hevea, the rubber trees, belonging to the family Euphorbiaceae. It is native to the island of Marajó in the Amazon delta in northeastern Brazil where it was discovered in 1975. It is a small tree and Its typical habitat is dry savannah and woodland bordering seasonally inundated swamps.

Distinguishing features include leaves with pale green undersides, whitish flowers with red bases, toothed basal disks, and single whorls of three to five stamens in the male flowers. The fruits contain three large, rounded seeds.

References

Trees of the Amazon
Trees of Brazil
Crotonoideae
Taxa named by João Murça Pires